Zee Marathi is an Indian general entertainment channel which carries programming in Marathi. It is owned by Zee Entertainment Enterprises. The channel was launched on 15 August 1999 and was known as Alpha TV Marathi until 28 March 2005, then it was renamed as Zee Marathi. It is the first Marathi GEC channel. A HD version of this channel, Zee Marathi HD, was launched on 20 November 2016.

Reception
The channel also has launched some mobile apps like Tumcha Aamcha Jamala, Home Minister, Kisaan Abhiman and Talent app. The channel content could also be viewed on ZEE5 app. Due to the COVID-19 pandemic, Zee Marathi stopped their all current shows from 27 March 2020 and they reran their old shows during lockdown period. After that from 8 June 2020, they started some short & new lockdown series and from 13 July 2020, they started their original shows.

The channel also arranges some functions like Nakshatranche Dene, Swaratarang, Ganeshotsav, Diwali Dhamaka, etc. It also had launched new magazines from 2017 like Khali Doke Var Pay (Summer Vacation), Sukhakarta (Ganesh Utsav), Utsav Natyancha (Diwali Festival) and a Newspaper Zee Marathi Disha. Zee Marathi revamped with new graphics and launched 7 new shows from 23 August 2021 on the occasion of 22nd anniversary.

Initially, the channel aired series from Monday to Friday, but from 1 July 2007, series started showing from Monday to Saturday. Also, from 24 July 2017, Zee Marathi had started a new prime time from 1 to 2 pm, but due to lack of response from the people, this prime time was closed on 25 November 2017. Zee Marathi channel has made films based on the episodes of the series Jai Malhar and Eka Lagnachi Dusri Goshta.

Zee Marathi started the Alpha Gaurav Award for Film and Drama Award in the year 2000 and Zee Marathi Utsav Natya Award for the series since 2004. In the year 2013, Unch Mazha Zoka Award was started to honor the women of the society. In 2015, Zee Marathi launched the Zee Gaurav Awards in two categories, the Zee Chitra Gaurav Award for movies and the Zee Natya Gaurav Award for plays. Zee Marathi organizes Swartarang every year to give Mumbai Police a break from work.

From April 2014, Zee Marathi started showing many experimental and commercial plays on Marathi theater every Sunday through Nakshatra. So the Nakshatra program became popular in a short time. Also, Zee Marathi has performed songs of old popular singers from the program Nakshatranche Dene. Zee Marathi airs series every Sunday in the month of May or October every year.

Current broadcast

Fiction series

Non-fiction shows

Former broadcast

Drama series
 Abhalmaya आभाळमाया
 Shriyut Gangadhar Tipre श्रीयुत गंगाधर टिपरे
 Avantika अवंतिका 
 Vadalvaat वादळवाट
 Avaghachi Sansar अवघाचि संसार
 Vahinisaheb वहिनीसाहेब
 Asambhav असंभव
 Maziya Priyala Preet Kalena माझिया प्रियाला प्रीत कळेना
 Pinjara पिंजरा
 Guntata Hriday He गुंतता हृदय हे
 Arundhati अरुंधती
 Dilya Ghari Tu Sukhi Raha दिल्या घरी तू सुखी राहा
 Eka Lagnachi Dusri Goshta एका लग्नाची दुसरी गोष्ट
 Unch Majha Zoka उंच माझा झोका
 Tu Tithe Me तू तिथे मी
 Mala Sasu Havi मला सासू हवी
 Radha Hi Bawari राधा ही बावरी
 Shejari Shejari Pakke Shejari शेजारी शेजारी पक्के शेजारी
 Tuza Maza Jamena तुझं माझं जमेना
 Honar Sun Me Hya Gharchi होणार सून मी ह्या घरची
 Eka Lagnachi Teesri Goshta एका लग्नाची तिसरी गोष्ट
 Julun Yeti Reshimgathi जुळून येती रेशीमगाठी
 Asmita अस्मिता
 Jawai Vikat Ghene Aahe जावई विकत घेणे आहे
 Jai Malhar जय मल्हार
 Ka Re Durava का रे दुरावा
 Ase He Kanyadan असे हे कन्यादान
 Dil Dosti Duniyadari दिल दोस्ती दुनियादारी
 Nanda Saukhya Bhare नांदा सौख्य भरे
 Majhe Pati Saubhagyawati माझे पती सौभाग्यवती
 Pasant Aahe Mulgi पसंत आहे मुलगी
 Ratris Khel Chale रात्रीस खेळ चाले
 Kahe Diya Pardes काहे दिया परदेस
 Khulta Kali Khulena खुलता कळी खुलेना
 Mazhya Navryachi Bayko माझ्या नवऱ्याची बायको
 Tujhyat Jeev Rangala तुझ्यात जीव रंगला
 100 Days १०० डेझ
 Chuk Bhul Dyavi Ghyavi चूक भूल द्यावी घ्यावी
 Naktichya Lagnala Yayach Ha नकटीच्या लग्नाला यायचं हं
 Dil Dosti Dobara दिल दोस्ती दोबारा
 Lagira Zhala Ji लागिरं झालं जी
 Jadubai Jorat जाडूबाई जोरात
 Gaav Gata Gajali गाव गाता गजाली
 Jago Mohan Pyaare जागो मोहन प्यारे
 Tuza Maza Breakup तुझं माझं ब्रेकअप
 Swarajyarakshak Sambhaji स्वराज्यरक्षक संभाजी
 Hum To Tere Aashiq Hai हम तो तेरे आशिक है
 Grahan ग्रहण
 Baaji बाजी
 Tula Pahate Re तुला पाहते रे
 Ratris Khel Chale 2 रात्रीस खेळ चाले २
 Mrs. Mukhyamantri मिसेस मुख्यमंत्री
 Aggabai Sasubai अग्गंबाई सासूबाई
 Bhago Mohan Pyare भागो मोहन प्यारे
 Alti Palti Sumdit Kalti अल्टी पल्टी सुमडीत कल्टी
 Lagnachi Wife Weddingchi Bayku लग्नाची वाईफ वेडिंगची बायकू
 Majha Hoshil Na माझा होशील ना
 Gharat Basale Saare घरात बसले सारे
 Total Hublak टोटल हुबलाक
 Devmanus देवमाणूस
 Ladachi Mi Lek Ga लाडाची मी लेक गं
 Karbhari Laybhari कारभारी लयभारी
 Kaay Ghadla Tya Ratri? काय घडलं त्या रात्री?
 Yeu Kashi Tashi Me Nandayla येऊ कशी तशी मी नांदायला
 Pahile Na Mi Tula पाहिले नं मी तुला
 Ghetla Vasa Taku Nako घेतला वसा टाकू नको
 Aggabai Sunbai अग्गंबाई सूनबाई
 Ratris Khel Chale 3 रात्रीस खेळ चाले ३
 Ti Parat Aaliye ती परत आलीये
 Man Jhala Bajind मन झालं बाजिंद
 Mazhi Tuzhi Reshimgath माझी तुझी रेशीमगाठ
 Man Udu Udu Zhala मन उडू उडू झालं
 Tuzya Mazya Sansarala Ani Kay Hava तुझ्या माझ्या संसाराला आणि काय हवं
 Devmanus 2 देवमाणूस २
 Satyawan Savitri सत्यवान सावित्री
 Abhiyaan अभियान
 Kunku कुंकू
 Kulvadhu कुलवधू
 Shubham Karoti शुभं करोति
 Pimpalpaan पिंपळपान
 Oon Paaus ऊन पाऊस
 Prapanch प्रपंच
 Bhagyalakshmi भाग्यलक्ष्मी
 Ya Sukhano Ya या सुखांनो या
 Kalat Nakalat कळत नकळत
 Savitri सावित्री
 Laxmanresha लक्ष्मणरेषा
 Reshimgaathi रेशीमगाठी
 Amarprem अमरप्रेम
 Aabhas Ha आभास हा
 De Dhamaal दे धमाल
 Waras वारस
 405 Anandvan ४०५ आनंदवन
 Nayak नायक 
 Adhuri Ek Kahani अधुरी एक कहाणी
 Anubandh अनुबंध
 Aamchyasarkhe Aamhich आमच्यासारखे आम्हीच
 Abhilasha अभिलाषा
 Agnipariksha अग्निपरीक्षा
 Aakrit आक्रित
 Ankur अंकुर
 Arth अर्थ
 Asa Mi Tasa Mi असा मी तसा मी
 Bandhan बंधन
 Chakravyuh Ek Sangarsha चक्रव्यूह एक संघर्ष
 Lajja लज्जा
 Darling Darling डार्लिंग डार्लिंग
 Duheri दुहेरी
 Duniyadari दुनियादारी
 Ek Ha Dhaga Asa Sukhacha एक हा धागा असा सुखाचा
 Eka Shwasache Antar एका श्वासाचे अंतर
 Ekach Hya Janmi Janu एकाच ह्या जन्मी जणू
 Gahire Pani गहिरे पाणी
 Indradhanushya इंद्रधनुष्य
 Jagavegali जगावेगळी
 Jibhela Kahi Had जिभेला काही हाड
 Kathakathi कथाकथी
 Kharach Majha Chukala Ka? खरंच माझं चुकलं का?
 Kinara किनारा
 Koparkhali कोपरखळी
 Kya Baat Hai! क्या बात है!
 Zhunj झुंज
 Megh Datale मेघ दाटले
 Misha मिशा
 Misal मिसाळ
 Mrunmayee मृण्मयी
 Nupur नुपूर
 Rimzim रिमझिम
 Runanubandh ऋणानुबंध
 Saheb Bibi Aani Mi साहेब बीबी आणि मी
 Saanjbhul सांजभूल
 Shravansari श्रावणसरी
 Tharar थरार
 Tujhyavina तुझ्याविना
 Vyakti Aani Valli व्यक्ती आणि वल्ली
 Zhale Mokale Aakash झाले मोकळे आकाश
 Malwani Days मालवणी डेझ
 Bhagyachi Hi Maherchi Saadi भाग्याची ही माहेरची साडी
 Police Files पोलीस फाइल्स
 Mumbai Police मुंबई पोलीस
 Constable Kamana Kamtekar कॉन्स्टेबल कामना कामतेकर
 Unit 9 युनिट ९
 Detective Jayram डिटेक्टिव्ह जयराम
 Buva Aala बुवा आला
 Ek Gaav Bhutacha एक गाव भुताचा
 Ajunahi Chandraat Aahe अजूनही चांदरात आहे
 Peshwai पेशवाई
 Tumbadche Khot तुंबाडचे खोत
 Sai Baba साईबाबा
 Geet Ramayan गीत रामायण

Dubbed shows

Non-fiction shows
 Aamhi Travelkar आम्ही ट्रॅव्हलकर
 Ram Ram Maharashtra राम राम महाराष्ट्र
 Housefull हाऊसफुल्ल
 Alpha Scholars अल्फा स्कॉलर्स
 Alpha Batmya अल्फा बातम्या
 Jallosh Ganrayacha जल्लोष गणरायाचा
 Pradakshina प्रदक्षिणा
 Naammatra नाममात्र
 Sade Made Teen साडे माडे तीन
 Jodi No.1 जोडी नं.१
 Goodmorning Maharashtra गुडमॉर्निंग महाराष्ट्र
 Manasi Tumchya Ghari मानसी तुमच्या घरी
 Dilkhulas दिलखुलास
 Ha Karyakram Baghu Naka हा कार्यक्रम बघू नका
 Sur Taal सूर ताल
 Vastraharan वस्त्रहरण
 Wajavu Ka? वाजवू का?
 Jagachi Wari Laybhari जगाची वारी लयभारी
 Bhatkanti भटकंती
 Discover Maharashtra डिस्कव्हर महाराष्ट्र
 Mast Maharashtra मस्त महाराष्ट्र
 Ghadlay Bighadalay घडलंय बिघडलंय
 Hasa Chakat Fu हसा चकट फू
 Comedy Dot Com कॉमेडी डॉट कॉम
 Cricket Club क्रिकेट क्लब
 Yuva युवा
 Book Shelf बुक शेल्फ
 Bol Bappa बोल बाप्पा
 Zee News Marathi झी न्यूज मराठी
 Namaskar Alpha नमस्कार अल्फा
 Aamane Samane आमने सामने
 Home sweet Home होम स्वीट होम
 Shopping Shopping शॉपिंग शॉपिंग
 Patanjali Yoga पतंजलि योग

Reality shows
 Sa Re Ga Ma Pa सा रे ग म प (14 seasons)
 Fu Bai Fu फू बाई फू (9 seasons)
 Eka Peksha Ek एका पेक्षा एक (7 seasons)
 Dance Maharashtra Dance डान्स महाराष्ट्र डान्स (3 seasons)
 Maharashtracha Superstar महाराष्ट्राचा सुपरस्टार (2 seasons)
 Kitchen Kallakar किचन कल्लाकार (2 seasons)
 Band Baja Varat बँड बाजा वरात (2 seasons)
 Zing Zing Zingat झिंग झिंग झिंगाट
 Kanala Khada कानाला खडा
 Ali Mili Gupchili अळी मिळी गुपचिळी
 Dancing Queen डान्सिंग क्वीन
 He Tar Kahich Nay हे तर काहीच नाय
 Maha Minister महा मिनिस्टर
 Bus Bai Bas Ladies Special बस बाई बस लेडीज स्पेशल
 Toofan Aalaya तुफान आलंया (3 seasons)
 Hapta Band हप्ता बंद (2 seasons)
 Hasyasamrat हास्यसम्राट (2 seasons)
 Khupte Tithe Gupte खुपते तिथे गुप्ते (2 seasons)
 Marathi Paul Padate Pudhe मराठी पाऊल पडते पुढे (2 seasons)
 Yala Jeevan Aise Naav याला जीवन ऐसे नाव
 Madhu Ithe An Chandra Tithe मधु इथे अन् चंद्र तिथे
 Dabba Gul डब्बा गुल
 Madhali Sutti मधली सुट्टी
 Maharashtrachi Lokdhara महाराष्ट्राची लोकधारा
 Tumcha Aamcha Jamala तुमचं आमचं जमलं

Award functions

Plays
Zee Marathi entered the Marathi Theatre as a presenter in 2018 to encourage this field.
 Hamlet
 Aaranyak
 Natsamrat
 Albatya Galbatya
 Eka Lagnachi Pudhchi Goshta
 Tila Kahi Sangaychay!
 Idiots
 Rajala Jawai Hava
 Kapuskondyachi Goshta
 Jhund
 Teesare Badshah Hum!
 Iblis

TV channels

References

External links
Zee Marathi website

Television stations in Mumbai
Marathi-language television channels
Zee Entertainment Enterprises
Television channels and stations established in 1999
Mass media in Mumbai
Mass media in Maharashtra
1999 establishments in Maharashtra